The men's K-2 1000 metres event was a pairs kayaking event conducted as part of the Canoeing at the 1996 Summer Olympics program.

Medalists

Results

Heats
24 crews entered in three heats. The top three finishers from each of the heats advanced directly to the semifinals while the remaining teams were relegated to the repechages.

Repechages
The top four crews in each of the two repechages and the fastest fifth-place finisher advanced to the semifinals.

Semifinals
The top four finishers in each of the two semifinals and the fastest fifth-place finisher advanced to the final.

Final
The final was held on August 3.

Germany led the first half of the race, but could not match the finishing power of the Italians. Scarpa, competing in his fourth Olympics, won a silver in the men's K-2 500 m event the following day.

References
1996 Summer Olympics official report Volume 3. pp. 170–1. 
Sports-reference.com 1996 K-2 1000 m results.
Wallechinsky, David and Jaime Loucky (2008). "Canoeing: Men's Kayak Pairs 1000 Meters". In The Complete Book of the Olympics: 2008 Edition. London: Aurum Press, Limited. p. 476.

Men's K-2 1000
Men's events at the 1996 Summer Olympics